The First Albanian School in Pristina is a cultural heritage monument in Pristina, Kosovo, and one of the oldest intact buildings in the entire city.

History and description
The first school in Pristina where students were taught in the Albanian language is in the western historic city center at the corner of Trepça and Ilir Konushevci Streets. The two-story building was built in the late 19th century by local grandee Avdurrahman Pasha. In 1880, the original building burnt down, but it was rebuilt by his sons. In 1908, the gymnasium (Idadije) opened with 250 pupils. After World War II, it was once used as a barracks for the Yugoslav People's Army, and later housed some families. The plastered stone-brick walls have degraded over time. The mezzanine is wooden with clay mortar. Parts of the northeastern façade show renovations on the windows, but the southwestern one is largely original.

References

Historic sites in Kosovo
Buildings and structures in Pristina